The West End Christian School hostage crisis occurred on February 2, 1988, when James L. Harvey took captive nearly 60 people, mostly children, inside the West End Christian School in Tuscaloosa, Alabama, United States. The siege came to an end when Harvey was shown a videotape made by Alabama Governor H. Guy Hunt in which the governor said that he would be granted a pardon and immunity. However, the promise was considered to have been written under duress, and thus carried no legal weight and was part of a ruse into getting him to surrender. After giving up his weapons, two pistols and a rifle, to authorities and preparing to lead the child hostages outside for what he believed would be a news conference, Harvey was wrestled to the ground by police and arrested.

Harvey's motives in committing the crime was to spread awareness of homelessness.

References
HOSTAGE INCIDENT AT SCHOOL ENDED February 3, 1988; New York Times

1988 crimes in the United States
Attacks in the United States in 1988
Hostage taking in the United States
Crimes in Alabama
1988 in Alabama